Paavana Gowda (born 2 June 1991) is an Indian actress who has appeared in Kannada and Tamil films. After making her debut in Gombegala Love (2013), she has been seen in films including  Tootu Madike (2022) and Vindhya Victim Verdict V3  (2023).

Career
Paavana made her acting debut in the critically-acclaimed romantic drama Gombegala Love (2013), portraying the role of a girl who is paralysed, who is then wedded to a man also bed ridden. She then continued to play lead roles in Kannada films, notably appearing in Jatta (2013) and Kannadiga (2021) opposite Ravichandran. In 2023, she made her debut in Tamil films with the title role in Vindhya Victim Verdict V3 (2023).

In 2018, Paavana began working on Badiger Devendra's female-centric film, Rudri, where she portrayed the lead role. The film won several awards during a run at international film festivals, including Best Actress for Paavana, and is expected to release in 2023. Her other completed, upcoming films include Mysore Diaries, Prabhutva, Karky, Kaliveera, Mehbooba, and Fighter.

Filmography
Films

References

External links 
 

Indian film actresses
Tamil actresses
Living people
Actresses in Tamil cinema
Actresses in Kannada cinema
21st-century Indian actresses
Year of birth missing (living people)